This is a list of armed conflicts in South America.

Argentina
c. 1472 — 1493 Topa Inca Yupanqui, the tenth Sapa Inca of the Inca Empire, extended the realm northward along the Andes through modern Ecuador, and developed a special fondness for the city of Quito, which he rebuilt with architects from Cuzco. During this time his father Pachacuti reorganized the Kingdom of Cuzco into the Tahuantinsuyu, the "four provinces". He led extensive military conquests to extend the Inca Empire across much of South America, within the boundaries of the nations which are today called Peru, Bolivia, Chile, and Argentina. He became Inca in his turn upon his father's death in 1471, ruling until his own death in 1493. He conquered Chimor, which occupied the northern coast of what is now Peru, the largest remaining rival to the Incas.
c. 1493 — 1527 Huayna Capac, the eleventh Sapa Inca of the Inca Empire, extended the Inca Empire significantly to the south into present-day Chile and Argentina and tried to annex territories towards the north, in what is now Ecuador and southern Colombia, founding cities like Atuntaqui. Further north, Huayna Capac's forces reached the Chinchipe River Basin but were pushed back by the Shuar in 1527. The Inca Empire reached the height of its size and power under his rule, stretching over much of present-day Bolivia, Peru, Argentina, Chile, Ecuador and southwestern Colombia. The lands conquered in the south within Bolivia, Argentina, and Chile would form the province Qullasuyu of the Inca Empire.
 1754 — 1757 Spanish-Portuguese invasion of the Jesuit-sponsored "Guarani Nation"
 1810 — 1818 Argentine War of Independence
 1814 — 1880 Argentine Civil Wars
 1837 — 1839 War between Argentina and Peru–Bolivian Confederation
 1904 — 1984 Beagle conflict
 1955 Revolución Libertadora
 1963 1963 Argentine Navy revolt
 1965 Laguna del Desierto incident
 1966 Argentine Revolution
1976 — 1983 The Dirty War 
 1975-1977 Operativo Independencia
 1975 Battle of Acheral
 1976 1976 Argentine coup d'état
 1982 — The Falklands War 
 1987 — 1990 Carapintadas uprisings
 1989 — Attack on La Tablada barracks
 2001 Argentinazo
 2013 police revolts in Argentina
 2020 17A protests 
 2020 — present 2020 Argentinian protests

Bolivia
c. 500 — c. 1100 Wari Empire
c. 1472 — 1493 Topa Inca Yupanqui, the tenth Sapa Inca of the Inca Empire, extended the realm northward along the Andes through modern Ecuador, and developed a special fondness for the city of Quito, which he rebuilt with architects from Cuzco. During this time his father Pachacuti reorganized the Kingdom of Cuzco into the Tahuantinsuyu, the "four provinces". He led extensive military conquests to extend the Inca Empire across much of South America, within the boundaries of the nations which are today called Peru, Bolivia, Chile, and Argentina. He became Inca in his turn upon his father's death in 1471, ruling until his own death in 1493. He conquered Chimor, which occupied the northern coast of what is now Peru, the largest remaining rival to the Incas. The lands conquered in the south within Bolivia, Argentina, and Chile would form the province Qullasuyu of the Inca Empire.
1780 — 1782 Rebellion of Túpac Amaru II by indigenous people, mestizos, blacks, and criollos against the Spanish Empire
1836 — 1839 War of the Confederation between the Peru-Bolivian Confederation and Chile
1879 — 1884 Bolivia and Peru fight Chile in the War of the Pacific
1932 — 1935 Chaco War between Bolivia and Paraguay
1946 La Paz riots
1966 — 1967 Ñancahuazú Guerrilla
 1970 Teoponte Guerrilla
 2008 unrest in Bolivia
 2011 — 2012 Bolivian Indigenous Rights Protests
 2019 Bolivian protests
 2020 Bolivian protests

Brazil
1557 — 1575 French-Portuguese conflict over France Antarctique, a French colony in Rio de Janeiro.
1591 — Thomas Cavendish, a British corsair, occupied Santos
1821 — 1825 Brazilian War of Independence
1835 — Malê Revolt
1835 — 1845 Republican revolt against the Empire of Brazil is put down in the Ragamuffin War
1896 — 1897 War of Canudos
1912 — 1916 Contestado War, a rebellion in Brazil, fails.
1932 — 1932 Constitutionalist Revolution, a failed uprising centered in São Paulo, Brazil
1961 — 1963 Lobster War
1964 1964 Brazilian coup d'état
1966 — 1975 Araguaia Guerrilla War
February 1991 — March 1991 Operation Traira
2006 2006 São Paulo violence outbreak
2010 2010 Rio de Janeiro security crisis
2013 June Journeys
2014 2014 protests in Brazil
2015 — 2016 2015–2016 protests in Brazil
2018 2018 Brazil truck drivers' strike
2021 2021 Brazilian protests

Chile
c. 500 — c. 1100 Wari Empire
c. 1472 — 1493 Topa Inca Yupanqui, the tenth Sapa Inca of the Inca Empire, extended the realm northward along the Andes through modern Ecuador, and developed a special fondness for the city of Quito, which he rebuilt with architects from Cuzco. During this time his father Pachacuti reorganized the Kingdom of Cuzco into the Tahuantinsuyu, the "four provinces". He led extensive military conquests to extend the Inca Empire across much of South America, within the boundaries of the nations which are today called Peru, Bolivia, Chile, and Argentina. He became Inca in his turn upon his father's death in 1471, ruling until his own death in 1493. He conquered Chimor, which occupied the northern coast of what is now Peru, the largest remaining rival to the Incas.
c. 1493 — 1527 Huayna Capac, the eleventh Sapa Inca of the Inca Empire, extended the Inca Empire significantly to the south into present-day Chile and Argentina and tried to annex territories towards the north, in what is now Ecuador and southern Colombia, founding cities like Atuntaqui. Further north, Huayna Capac's forces reached the Chinchipe River Basin but were pushed back by the Shuar in 1527. The Inca Empire reached the height of its size and power under his rule, stretching over much of present-day Bolivia, Peru, Argentina, Chile, Ecuador and southwestern Colombia. The lands conquered in the south within Bolivia, Argentina, and Chile would form the province Qullasuyu of the Inca Empire.
1535 — 1537 Expedition to Chile of the Spanish conqueror Diego de Almagro.
1536 Battle of Reynogüelén
16th century — 17th or 18th century Arauco War
1546 Battle of Quilacura
1550 Battle of Andalien
1550 Battle of Penco
1553 Battle of Tucapel
1554 Battle of Marihueñu
1556 Battle of Peteroa
1557 Battle of Mataquito
1557 Battle of Lagunillas
1557 Battle of Millarapue
1558 Battle of Quiapo
1564 Siege of Concepcion
1564 Battle of Angol
1569 Battle of Catirai
1598 Disaster of Curalaba
1599 — 1604 Destruction of the Seven Cities
1612 Defensive War
1655 Mapuche Insurrection
1712 Huilliche rebellion
1723 The Mapuche Uprising
1759, 1766, and 1769 The Mapuche Rebellions
1792 Huilliche Rebellion of 1792
1810 — 1826 Chilean War of Independence
1829 — 1830 Chilean Civil War
1836 — 1839 War of the Confederation between the Peru-Bolivian Confederation and Chile
1851 Chilean Revolution
1861 — 1883 Occupation of Araucanía
1864 — 1866 The Chincha Islands War between Spain and former colonies Peru and Chile occurs
1879 — 1884 Bolivia and Peru fight Chile in the War of the Pacific
1891 1891 Chilean Civil War
1973 Tanquetazo
1973 1973 Chilean coup d'etat
1973 — 1990 Armed resistance in Chile (1973–1990)
2019 — present 2019–2021 Chilean protests

Colombia
c. 1493 — 1527 Huayna Capac, the eleventh Sapa Inca of the Inca Empire, extended the Inca Empire significantly to the south into present-day Chile and Argentina and tried to annex territories towards the north, in what is now Ecuador and southern Colombia, founding cities like Atuntaqui. Further north, Huayna Capac's forces reached the Chinchipe River Basin but were pushed back by the Shuar in 1527. The Inca Empire reached the height of its size and power under his rule, stretching over much of present-day Bolivia, Peru, Argentina, Chile, Ecuador and southwestern Colombia. The lands conquered in the north within Peru, Ecuador, and Colombia would form the province Chinchay Suyu of the Inca Empire.
1470 – 1490 Muisca warfare
1499 – 1602 Spanish conquest of the Chibchan Nations
1537 – 1539 Spanish conquest of the Muisca
1828 – 1829 Gran Colombia–Peru War
1860 – 1862 Colombian Civil War
1899 – 1902 Colombian Thousand Days' War
1932 – 1933 Colombia–Peru War
1948 – 1958 La Violencia in Colombia.
1964 – present Colombian conflict.
 1980 1980 Dominican Republic Embassy siege in Bogotá
 1985 Palace of Justice siege
 2004 – 2006 Operation JM
 2008 Operation Jaque
 2013 2013 Colombian clashes
 2018 Catatumbo campaign
 2013 2013 Colombian coffee growers strike
 2019 – 2020 2019–2020 Colombian protests
 2021 – present 2021 Colombian protests

Ecuador
c. 1471 — 1493 Topa Inca Yupanqui, the tenth Sapa Inca of the Inca Empire, extended the realm northward along the Andes through modern Ecuador, and developed a special fondness for the city of Quito, and conquered Chimor
c. 1493 — 1527 Huayna Capac, the eleventh Sapa Inca of the Inca Empire, extended the Inca Empire significantly to the south into present-day Chile and Argentina and tried to annex territories towards the north, in what is now Ecuador and southern Colombia, founding cities like Atuntaqui. Further north, Huayna Capac's forces reached the Chinchipe River Basin but were pushed back by the Shuar in 1527. The Inca Empire reached the height of its size and power under his rule, stretching over much of present-day Bolivia, Peru, Argentina, Chile, Ecuador and southwestern Colombia. The lands conquered in the north within Peru, Ecuador, and Colombia would form the province Chinchay Suyu of the Inca Empire.
 1911 — 1912 War of the Generals 
 1912 — 1914 Ecuadorian Civil War of 1912–1914
 1941 Ecuadorian-Peruvian War
 1981 Paquisha War
 1995 The Cenepa War
 2012 2012 Ecuadorian protests
 2015 2015 Ecuadorian protests
 2019 2019 Ecuadorian protests
 2020 2020 Ecuadorian protests

French Guiana
Portuguese conquest of French Guiana.

Peru
c. 900 BCE — c. 200 BCE Chavín culture

c. 500 — c. 1100 CE Wari Empire

c. 1230 Sinchi Roca, the second Sapa Inca of the Kingdom of Cuzco, waged war against a nearby kingdom after the killing of the Inca diplomat Teuotihi
c. 1290 Mayta Cápac, the fourth Sapa Inca of the Kingdom of Cuzco, put the regions of Arequipa and Moquegua under the control of the Inca empire
c. 1320 Cápac Yupanqui, the fifth Sapa Inca of the Kingdom of Cuzco, was the first Inca to conquer territory outside the valley of Cuzco
c. 1350 — c. 1380 Inca Roca, the sixth Sapa Inca of the Kingdom of Cuzco, is said to have conquered the Chancas
c. 1380 Yáhuar Huácac, the seventh Sapa Inca of the Kingdom of Cuzco, abandoned the capital in an attack by the Chancas
c. 1410 — c. 1438 Viracocha Inca, the eighth Sapa Inca of the Kingdom of Cuzco, defended the capital against the attack by the Chancas
c. 1438 — c. 1472 Pachacuti, the ninth Sapa Inca of the Kingdom of Cuzco, defeated the Chancas and the Chimú

c. 1472 — c. 1493 Topa Inca Yupanqui, the tenth Sapa Inca of the Inca Empire, extended the realm northward along the Andes through modern Ecuador, and developed a special fondness for the city of Quito, which he rebuilt with architects from Cuzco. During this time his father Pachacuti reorganized the Kingdom of Cuzco into the Tahuantinsuyu, the "four provinces". He led extensive military conquests to extend the Inca Empire across much of South America, within the boundaries of the nations which are today called Peru, Bolivia, Chile, and Argentina. He became Inca in his turn upon his father's death in 1471, ruling until his own death in 1493. He conquered Chimor, which occupied the northern coast of what is now Peru, the largest remaining rival to the Incas.

c. 1493 — c. 1527 Huayna Capac, the eleventh Sapa Inca of the Inca Empire, extended the Inca Empire significantly to the south into present-day Chile and Argentina and tried to annex territories towards the north, in what is now Ecuador and southern Colombia, founding cities like Atuntaqui. Further north, Huayna Capac's forces reached the Chinchipe River Basin but were pushed back by the Shuar in 1527. The Inca Empire reached the height of its size and power under his rule, stretching over much of present-day Bolivia, Peru, Argentina, Chile, Ecuador and southwestern Colombia.

c. 1529 — c. 1532 Inca Civil War
1529 Battle of Chillopampa
1531 Battle of Mullihambato
1531 Battle of Chimborazo War between Atahualpa and Huascar.
1532 Battle of Huanucopampa
1532 Battle of Quipaipan
1525 — 1572 Spanish conquest of the Inca Empire
1525 Battle of Punta Quemada
1531 Battle of Puná
1532 Battle of Cajamarca
1533 Battle of Vilcaconga
1533 Battle of Cuzco
1534 Battle of Maraycalla
1534 Battle of Mount Chimborazo
1536 Siege of Cuzco
1537 Battle of Ollantaytambo
1537 Battle of Abancay
1538 Battle of Las Salinas
1542 Battle of Chupas
1546 Battle of Añaquito
1547 Battle of Huarina
1548 Battle of Jaquijahuana
1572 Final war with Spain

 1780 — 1782 Rebellion of Túpac Amaru II
1812 — 1821 Peruvian War of Independence
 1821 — 1998 Ecuadorian–Peruvian territorial dispute
1836 — 1839 War of the Confederation
1837 — 1839 War between Argentina and Peru–Bolivian Confederation
1879 — 1884 War of the Pacific
1932 — 1933 Leticia Incident with Colombia.
1941 — 1942 Ecuadorian–Peruvian War 
1968 1968 Peruvian coup d'état
1981 — Paquisha War.
1980 —  Internal conflict in Peru
 1982 Assault of Ayacucho prison
 1992 1992 Peruvian coup d'état
 1997 Operation Chavín de Huántar
 2016 Hatun Asha ambush
1995 Cenepa war
2009 2009 Peruvian political crisis
2015 2015 Peruvian protests against Las Bambas mining project
2017 — present 2017–present Peruvian political crisis
 2018 2018 Peruvian agrarian strike
 2019 — 2020 2019–2020 Peruvian constitutional crisis
 2020 2020 Peruvian protests
 2020 — 2021 2020–2021 Peruvian agrarian strike
 2022 2022 Peruvian protests

Paraguay
1864 — 1870 War Of The Triple Alliance
1911 — 1912 Paraguayan Civil War (1911–1912)
1922 — Paraguayan Civil War (1922) 
1932 — 1935 Chaco War 
1947 — Paraguayan Civil War (1947)
1954 1954 Paraguayan coup d'état
1989 1989 Paraguayan coup d'état
1996 1996 Paraguayan coup d'état attempt
1999 Marzo paraguayo
2000 2000 Paraguayan coup d'état attempt
2005 — present Paraguayan People's Army insurgency
2017 2017 Paraguayan crisis
2021 — present 2021 Paraguayan protests

Uruguay
1820 — 1828 Cisplatine War
1839 — 1851 Uruguayan Civil War
1851 — 1852 Platine War
1864 — 1865 Uruguayan War
1865 — 1870 Paraguayan War
1870 — 1872 Revolution of the Lances
1903 — 1904 Aparicio Saravia revolt
1973 — 1985 1973 Uruguayan coup d'état

Venezuela
1567 Battle of Maracapana 
1811 — 1823 Venezuelan War of Independence
1859 — 1863 Federal War
1908 Dutch-Venezuela War
1958 1958 Venezuelan coup d'état
1962 El Carupanazo
1962 El Porteñazo
1967 Machurucuto incident
1989 Caracazo
1992 1992 Venezuelan coup d'état attempts
2002 2002 Venezuelan coup d'état attempt
2007 2007 RCTV protests
2010 — present Crisis in Venezuela
2013 2013 Venezuelan presidential election protests
2014 — present Venezuelan protests (2014–present)
2017 2017 Venezuelan protests
2017 Mother of All Marches
2017 Attack on Fort Paramacay
2018 El Junquito raid
2018 — present Pemon conflict
2019 — present Venezuelan presidential crisis
2019 2019 Venezuelan uprising attempt
2019 2019 Venezuelan protests
2020 Operation Gideon (2020)
2021 2021 Apure clashes

Suriname
1804 Battle of Suriname
1980 1980 Surinamese coup d'etat
1986 — 1992 Surinamese Interior War
1990 1990 Surinamese coup d'etat

Guyana
1712 Cassard expedition
1763 — 1764 Berbice slave uprising
1823 Demerara rebellion of 1823
1969 Rupununi Uprising

See also
List of conflicts in North America
List of conflicts in Central America
List of conflicts in Europe
List of conflicts in Africa
List of conflicts in Asia
List of conflicts in the Near East
List of conflicts in the Middle East
List of wars
Revolutions of Brazil

South America
Rebellions in South America
Conflicts